Jacqueline 'Jackie' Brady (born 12 December 1975) is a female British former artistic gymnast.

Younger sister, Suzanne ‘Suzy’ Brady Kerfoot (born 20 September 1978) is currently ranked as number 3 over 30’s intermediate women’s artistic gymnastics champion (2019).

Gymnastics career
Brady represented England in four events at the 1994 Commonwealth Games in Victoria, British Columbia, Canada. She won a gold medal in the team event and a silver medal on the floor.

References

External links
 
 

1975 births
Living people
British female artistic gymnasts
English female artistic gymnasts
Commonwealth Games medallists in gymnastics
Commonwealth Games gold medallists for England
Commonwealth Games silver medallists for England
Gymnasts at the 1994 Commonwealth Games
Medallists at the 1994 Commonwealth Games